Desmond Penigar (born July 16, 1981) is an American former professional basketball player. A 6'7" tall forward, he attended Utah State University and Ventura College. Penigar was a member of the Orlando Magic of the National Basketball Association during the 2003–04 NBA season. As a member of the Asheville Altitude, he won the 2003–04 National Basketball Development League Rookie of the Year award.

He has played professionally in South Korea, Germany, Austria, Lebanon, Kuwait and Saudi Arabia.

Professional awards and achievements
NBDL Rookie of the Year -04
All-NBDL 1st Team -04
NBDL Regular Season Champion -04
NBDL Champion -04
Austrian Bundesliga A All-Star Game -09
Eurobasket.com All-Austrian Bundesliga Imports Team -09
Eurobasket.com All-Austrian Bundesliga 1st Team -09, 10
Austrian Bundesliga A Semifinals -09
Austrian Supercup Winner -09
Austrian A Bundesliga All-Star Game -10
Eurobasket.com Austrian Bundesliga All-Imports Team -10
Austrian Bundesliga A Finalist -10
Austrian Bundesliga A Regular Season Champion -10
Asia-Basket.com All-Lebanese League 1st Team -12
Asia-Basket.com Lebanese League All-Imports Team -12
Asia-Basket.com Lebanese League All-Defensive Team -12
Kuwait Federation Cup Winner -13
Kuwait League Regular Season Champion -13

College and high school awards and achievements
HS first-team all-league and all-county selection -98,99
JUCO runner-up player of the year in the state of California -00,01
JUCO first-team all-conference and all-state selection -00,01
Big West Conference Regular Season Champion -02 (Utah State)
Big West Conference Tournament Finalist -02 (Utah State)
All-Big West Conference 1st Team -02,03
Big West Tournament Champion -03
Big West All-Tournament Team -03

References

External links
Desmond Penigar NBA caseer statistics, basketballreference.com
http://www.nba.com/playerfile/desmond_penigar/index.html

1981 births
Living people
African-American basketball players
American expatriate basketball people in Austria
American expatriate basketball people in Germany
American expatriate basketball people in Lebanon
American expatriate basketball people in Saudi Arabia
American expatriate basketball people in South Korea
American men's basketball players
Asheville Altitude players
Basketball players from Louisiana
BSC Fürstenfeld Panthers players
Changwon LG Sakers players
EWE Baskets Oldenburg players
Orlando Magic players
People from DeQuincy, Louisiana
Power forwards (basketball)
Undrafted National Basketball Association players
Utah State Aggies men's basketball players
Ventura Pirates men's basketball players
Sagesse SC basketball players
21st-century African-American sportspeople
20th-century African-American people